Jalahalli Ramaiah Ashoka (born 1 July 1957) is an Indian politician serving as the Minister of Revenue of Karnataka from 20 August 2019. He is also the Vice-Chairman for the Karnataka State Disaster Management Authority and the district in-charge minister for Bangalore rural. He has previously served as the 6th Deputy Chief Minister of Karnataka. He has previously served as the Deputy Leader of Opposition in Karnataka Legislative Assembly (2014 -2018),  Minister of Home Affairs and Minister of Transport under the BJP government. He has also served as the Minister of Health and Family Welfare under the coalition government of BJP and JDS. He is a six-time MLA (Member of the Legislative Assembly) for the Padmanabhanagar (formerly Uttarahalli) constituency.

Early political career
During Emergency (1975–77), he was arrested and detained in prison along with veteran leaders like L.K. Advani at the Central Jail in Bengaluru. He was first elected to the Karnataka Legislative Assembly in the 1997 by-Elections from Uttarahalli, which was the biggest state legislature constituency in India before delimitation. He was re-elected from the same constituency in 1999 and 2004 Assembly elections with impressive margins. In the 2004 elections, he won by a margin of 84,001 votes which is the highest in any Karnataka Assembly election.

Positions held
In 2008, he became the Minister of Health and family welfare in the Bharatiya Janata Party-Janata Dal (Secular) (BJP-JD(S)) coalition government. As a minister, he implemented novel schemes and also streamlined the administration of the department. He undertook surprise visits to the hospitals to inspect and review their functioning. Also, he raided many private clinics in rural areas and tried to eliminate the menace of fake medical practitioners in the state.

As Minister of Transport in the Yeddyurappa Government from 2008 onwards, he was instrumental in modernizing the department and also using innovative hi-tech methods to automate the working of the department.

When Jagadish Shettar became Chief Minister in June 2012, Ashoka was appointed one of the two Deputy chief ministers and entrusted with the ministries of Home and Transport in the Government of Karnataka.

Ashoka is regarded as one of the most influential leaders of the BJP in Bangalore city and has steered the party to historic victories in the 2010 and 2015 BBMP elections.

On 26 August 2019, Ashoka was appointed the Revenue Minister in Karnataka government excluding Muzrai.

References 

1957 births
Bharatiya Janata Party politicians from Karnataka
Karnataka MLAs 1994–1999
Karnataka MLAs 1999–2004
Karnataka MLAs 2004–2007
Karnataka MLAs 2008–2013
Karnataka MLAs 2013–2018
State cabinet ministers of Karnataka
Deputy Chief Ministers of Karnataka
Living people
Karnataka MLAs 2018–2023